Abadin Tadia Tjoessoep (1626–23 May 1699), more commonly known as Sheikh Yusuf or Sheik Joseph, was an Indonesian Muslim of noble descent. He was also known as Muhammad Yusuf al-Maqassari. In 1693 he was exiled to the Cape of Good Hope, South Africa, which resulted in his establishing Islam in the Cape.

Early and middle life (Nusantara)
Yusuf was born as nephew of the Sultan Alauddin of Gowa, in today Makassar, Indonesia. In 1644 he embarked on the Hajj to Mecca and spent several years in Arabia learning under various pious scholars. During this period the Dutch and British East India Companies were fighting for control of the region due to its lucrative trade in spices and gold. When Yusuf left Arabia in 1664, Makassar had been captured by the Dutch, and he was unable to return home. Instead, he headed for Bantam on the island of Java, where he was welcomed by Sultan Ageng Tirtayasa. Ageng gave Yusuf the hand of one of his daughters in marriage, and made him his chief religious judge and personal advisor. Yusuf stayed in Bantam for 16 years until 1680, when Ageng's son, Pangeran Hajji, rose against his father, possibly at the urgings of the Dutch East India Company. Ageng rallied his forces, including Yusuf, and in 1683 besieged Hajji in his fortress at Soerdesoeang. Ageng was defeated but managed to escape capture, along with an entourage of about 5,000, among them the 57-year-old Yusuf. Ageng was captured later that year but Yusuf managed to escape a second time and continued the resistance.

Exile to the Cape and establishment of Islam

In 1684 Yusuf was persuaded to surrender on the promise of a pardon, but the Dutch reneged on their promise and instead imprisoned him at the castle of Batavia. Suspecting that he would attempt escape, the Dutch transferred him to Ceylon in September that year, before exiling him to the Cape on 27 June 1693 on the ship Voetboeg. Yusuf, along with 49 followers including two wives, two concubines and twelve children, were received in the Cape on 2 April 1694 by governor Simon van der Stel. They were housed on the farm Zandvliet, far outside of Cape Town, in an attempt to minimise his influence on the DEIC's slaves. The plan failed however; Yusuf's settlement soon became a sanctuary for slaves and it was here that the first cohesive Islamic community in South Africa was established. From here the message of Islam was disseminated to the slave community of Cape Town.

Sheikh Yusuf died at Zandvliet on 23 May 1699. Thereafter the area surrounding Zandvliet farm had been renamed Macassar after his place of birth. He was buried on the hills of Faure, overlooking Macassar.

Legacy and honours
As honour to Sheikh Yusuf, a shrine had been erected over his grave and to this day Muslims in the area visit it to pay their respects.

Sheikh Yusuf was declared a National Hero of Indonesia on August 7th, 1995. He was also posthumously awarded the Order of the Companions of O. R. Tambo in Gold on September 27th, 2005, for his contribution to the struggle against colonialism.

Sources

References

Indonesian Muslims
South African Muslims
Yusuf
1626 births
1699 deaths
Recipients of the Order of the Companions of O. R. Tambo
Order of Mendi for Bravery
17th-century Indonesian people